The 2016–17 Botola, also known as Botola Maroc Telecom for sponsorship reasons, is the 60th season of the Premier League and the 6th under its new format of Moroccan Pro League, the top Moroccan professional league for association football clubs, since its establishment in 1915. The fixtures were announced on 2 August 2016. The season started on 27 August 2016 and may be ended on 28 May 2017.

FUS Rabat came into the season as defending champions of the 2015–16 season. Chabab Atlas Khénifra and Chabab Kasbah Tadla entered as the two promoted teams from the 2015–16 GNF 2.

Wydad Casablanca won the league for a record 19th time in Botola history after beating Olympic Safi on 17 May 2017.

Teams

Stadium and locations

Number of teams by regions

Personnel and kits 

1. On the back of shirt.
2. On the sleeves.
3. On the shorts.
 Maroc Telecom is a sponsor for all the league's teams.
 Additionally, referee kits are made by Adidas.

Managerial changes

Results

League table

Result table

Season statistics

Scoring

Top scorers

Top assists

Hat-tricks 

(H) – Home ; (A) – Away

Annual awards 
The Royal Moroccan Football Federation, in coordination with the LNFP ( Ligue Nationale du Football Professionnel) and the UMFP (Union Marocaine des Footballeurs Professionnels), organized on Monday 3 July 2017  the 3rd edition of the "Stars' Night" in honor of the players, coaches and referees who were distinguished during the 2016/2017 season.

See also
2016 Coupe du Trône
2016–17 GNF 2
2017 CAF Champions League
2017 CAF Confederation Cup
2017 Arab Club Championship

References

External links

Fédération Royale Marocaine de Football

Botola seasons
Morocco
1